Funk Wav Bounces Vol. 1 is the fifth studio album by Scottish DJ and record producer Calvin Harris. It was released on 30 June 2017 by Columbia Records. The album features guest vocals by Frank Ocean, Migos, Schoolboy Q, PartyNextDoor, DRAM, Young Thug, Pharrell Williams, Ariana Grande, Future, Khalid, Travis Scott, Snoop Dogg, John Legend, Nicki Minaj, Katy Perry, Big Sean, Kehlani, Lil Yachty, and Jessie Reyez, as well as prominent writing contributions from Starrah. It is also Harris' first album not to feature his vocals.

Funk Wav Bounces Vol. 1 was supported by five singles: "Slide", "Heatstroke", "Rollin", "Feels", and "Faking It". The album received generally positive reviews from critics, and debuted at number two on both the UK Albums Chart and the US Billboard 200.

Background
Harris previously announced that he would release 10 new singles in 2017. On 15 February, he tweeted that he had "worked with the greatest artists of our generation". Later, on 9 May, he confirmed the album would be released on 30 June.

Promotion
The album's lead single, "Slide", was released on 23 February 2017. The song features guest vocals from American singer Frank Ocean and American rappers Quavo and Offset from the hip hop group Migos.

The album's second single, "Heatstroke", was released on 31 March 2017. The song features guest vocals from American rapper Young Thug, American singer and rapper Pharrell Williams, and American singer Ariana Grande.

The album's third single, "Rollin", was released on 12 May 2017. The song features guest vocals from American rapper Future and American singer Khalid. It was later released to rhythmic contemporary radio on 27 June 2017.

The album's fourth single, "Feels", was released on 16 June 2017. The song features guest vocals from American singer-songwriters Pharrell Williams and Katy Perry, and American rapper Big Sean. It was later released to contemporary hit radio on 20 June 2017.

The album's fifth single, "Faking It", was released to contemporary hit radio on 17 October 2017. The song features guest vocals from American singer Kehlani and American rapper Lil Yachty.

Critical reception

Funk Wav Bounces Vol. 1 was met with generally positive reviews. At Metacritic, which assigns a normalized rating out of 100 to reviews from professional publications, the album received an average score of 70, based on 15 reviews. Aggregator AnyDecentMusic? gave it 6.6 out of 10, based on their assessment of the critical consensus.

Neil Z. Yeung from AllMusic gave a positive review, stating "Calvin Harris managed to find a way to distill the sounds of summer into a near-perfect spirit on his fifth effort, Funk Wav Bounces Vol. 1, assembling an all-star roster of performers for an economic ten-track burst that doesn't overstay its welcome". He summed up the review by saying "Funk Wav Bounces impresses not just with the marquee names, but with how effortless, communal and fun Harris makes it all feel". Clayton Purdom of The A.V. Club said, "It's a winning bid for artistic credibility: not going for smarter, more complex, or bigger, just better, more fun. Full of island affectations, soft-rock gloss, and chintzy good-life strings, it is, at last, the sort of fun you don’t have to feel bad about the next day". Collin Brennan of Consequence wrote: "Funk Wav Bounces isn't the kind of album that's going to change the conversation in pop music, but it doesn't want to. All it wants to do is sit by the pool, release, let go, and have a good time." Leonie Cooper of NME was also positive, saying the album is, "a triumph, a good-time album of wall-to-wall hits with a carefree, funky tropical feel and more than enough cool points to see him embraced by the hipster crowd as well as holding on to the pop kids".

In a mixed review, The Guardians Alexis Petridis stated: "Harris seems unsure whether an 80s boogie revival is the future of either dance music or mainstream pop, however. Elsewhere, there's a sense of bets being hedged and versatility being demonstrated to varying degrees of success." Jon O'Brien of Prefix Magazine said, "Ultimately, Harris appears to have simply swapped one formula for another, and if there's to be a Funk Wav Bounces Vol. 2 he will need to discover at least a few new tricks. ... [But] there are encouraging signs here that the Harris of old hasn't been entirely lost for good". In his review, Josh Goller of Slant Magazine states, "By showing little interest in challenging the clichés of men fixated on conquest and status symbols and women focused on "feels", Harris undermines what could have been an inspired creative reinvention". In a negative review, Andy Gill of The Independent said, "It's a typical contacts-book R&B exercise, with an impressive cast of guests (including Frank, Pharrell, Snoop, Nicki, Katy, Ariana and others) on a fairly underwhelming series of grooves".

Year-end lists

Commercial performance
Funk Wav Bounces Vol. 1 debuted at number two on the UK Albums Chart with 19,000 copies sold in its first week, including 7,000 from streams. The album debuted at number two on the US Billboard 200 with 68,000 album-equivalent units—the highest position for Harris and the highest debut of any artist in the week of its release. In its first week, Funk Wav Bounces Vol. 1 sold nearly twice as many units as Harris's last album, Motion, sold in its first week.

Track listing
All tracks produced by Calvin Harris.

Personnel
Credits adapted from the album's liner notes.

Musicians

Calvin Harris – Ibanez 1200 Bass (all tracks), Gibson SG Custom (tracks 1–3, 5, 7, 8, 10), Fender Rhodes (tracks 1, 2, 4–6, 9), Linn LM-2 (tracks 1, 3, 4, 6–8), Roland Jupiter-8 (tracks 1–5, 7), PPG Wave 2.2 (tracks 1, 4–7), Yamaha C7 Piano (tracks 1, 4, 5, 9), 1965 Fender Stratocaster (tracks 3, 4, 7, 8), Roland TR-808 (tracks 1, 5, 9), Sequential Circuits Prophet-5 (tracks 1, 6), 1976 Yamaha UX Ebony Piano (tracks 3, 8), Wurlitzer electric piano (tracks 3, 8), claps (tracks 6, 8), Flexitone (track 3), ARP String Ensemble PE-IV (track 4), SCI Drumtraks (track 10)
A-Trak – Technics SL-1200 turntables (track 5), Pioneer DJM-S9 mixer (track 5)
Clyde Audio – Wurlitzer (track 6)
Big Sean – vocals (track 8)
Rogét Chahayed – Korg SV-1 (track 2)
DRAM – vocals (track 2)
Frank Ocean – vocals (track 1)
Future – vocals (track 4)
Ariana Grande – vocals (track 3)
John Legend – vocals (track 6)
Katy Perry – vocals (track 8)
Kehlani – vocals (track 9)
Khalid – vocals (track 4)
Lil Yachty – vocals (track 9)
Migos – vocals (track 1)
 Takeoff – vocals (track 6)
Nicki Minaj – vocals (track 7)
PartyNextDoor – vocals (track 2)
Candice Pillay – background vocals (track 2)
Jessie Reyez – vocals (track 10), background vocals (track 9)
Schoolboy Q – vocals (track 2)
Snoop Dogg – vocals (track 6)
Starrah – additional background vocals (track 3)
Travis Scott – vocals (track 5)
Joe Vinyl – background vocals (track 6), strings (track 9)
Pharrell Williams – vocals (tracks 3, 8), Fender Rhodes (track 3), additional percussion (track 3)
Young Thug – vocals (track 3)

Production and design 

Calvin Harris – production (all tracks), recording (tracks 1, 4, 6, 10), mixing (all tracks)
Louis Bell – additional vocal editing (track 9)
Andrew Coleman – recording (track 3)
Nick Cooper – vocal production (track 7)
Aubry "Big Juice" Delaine – recording (track 7)
Jacob Dennis – recording assistance (track 8)
Matthew Desrameaux – recording assistance (track 3)
Blake Harden – recording (track 5)
David "Prep" Hughes – recording (track 2)
Ian Findlay – recording assistance (track 8)
Seth Firkins – recording (track 4)
Shawn "Source" Jarrett – recording (track 3)
Dave Kutch – mastering (all tracks)
Mike Larson – recording (track 8)
Thomas "Tillie" Mann – recording (track 9)
Daryl "DJ Durel" McPherson – recording (tracks 1, 6)
Gregg Rominiecki – recording (track 8)
Marcos Tovar – recording (tracks 1–3, 5, 8, 9)
Pharrell Williams – additional vocal production (track 3)
Mark Kalman – creative direction
Emil Nava – photography
Uber and Kosher – art direction

Charts

Weekly charts

Year-end charts

Certifications

See also
List of Billboard number-one electronic albums of 2017
List of number-one albums of 2017 (Canada)
List of number-one albums of 2017 (Finland)

References

2017 albums
Calvin Harris albums
Columbia Records albums
Boogie albums
Post-disco albums
Albums produced by Calvin Harris
Albums recorded at Westlake Recording Studios
Disco albums by Scottish artists
Funk albums by Scottish artists